The Ottomans: Europe's Muslim Emperors is a 2013 BBC Two documentary in three parts presented by Rageh Omaar. The series covers the origins of the Ottoman Empire; contrasts the empire under Suleiman the Magnificent with that of Abdul-Hamid II; and covers the demise of the Empire after the First World War.

Episodes

See also
 List of Islamic films

References

External links

Official dvd release

2013 British television series debuts
2013 British television series endings
BBC television documentaries about history
BBC high definition shows
English-language television shows